{{DISPLAYTITLE:C23H26FN3O2}}
The molecular formula C23H26FN3O2 (molar mass: 395.470 g/mol, exact mass: 395.2009 u) may refer to:

 PX-1
 Spiperone

Molecular formulas